Fernando García Puchades (born 13 June 1994) is a Spanish footballer who plays mainly as a right winger.

Club career
Born in Valencia, Nando joined Valencia CF's youth setup in 2007, aged 13. On 7 August 2013 he was loaned to Ribarroja CF in Tercera División, making his debut as a senior for the side during the campaign.

Nando returned to the Che in the middle of 2014, being assigned to the reserves in Segunda División B. On 8 April 2015 he renewed his contract until 2018, after being linked to FC Barcelona and Real Madrid.

On 16 July 2015 Nando was loaned to Córdoba CF in Segunda División, for one year. He made his professional debut on 22 August, starting in a 1–0 home win against Real Valladolid.

Nando scored his first professional goal on 29 November 2015, netting his team's second in a 2–1 home win against Real Oviedo. On 1 August of the following year he joined the latter, signing a one-year loan deal.

Nando appeared in the 2017 pre-season with Valencia's main squad, but on 26 August of that year, he signed a three-year contract with fellow La Liga side Deportivo Alavés, being immediately loaned to Lorca FC in the second division. On 2 July of the following year, he moved to Ligue 2 side FC Sochaux-Montbéliard also on a one-year loan deal. 

On 17 January 2019, Nando returned to his home country and joined Extremadura UD in the second division, on loan until June. On 2 September, he terminated his contract with Alavés. On 31 January 2020 García signed for Racing de Santander until 30 June.

References

External links
Valencia official profile

1994 births
Living people
Footballers from Valencia (city)
Spanish footballers
Spanish expatriate footballers
Association football wingers
Segunda División players
Primera Federación players
Segunda División B players
Tercera División players
Ligue 2 players
Ekstraklasa players
Cypriot First Division players
Valencia CF Mestalla footballers
Córdoba CF players
Real Oviedo players
Deportivo Alavés players
Lorca FC players
Extremadura UD footballers
Racing de Santander players
Albacete Balompié players
CF Rayo Majadahonda players
FC Sochaux-Montbéliard players
Arka Gdynia players
AEK Larnaca FC players
Spanish expatriate sportspeople in France
Spanish expatriate sportspeople in Poland
Spanish expatriate sportspeople in Cyprus
Expatriate footballers in France
Expatriate footballers in Poland
Expatriate footballers in Cyprus